Gorno Palčište is a village in the municipality of Bogovinje, North Macedonia.

History
According to the 1467-68 Ottoman defter, Gorno Palčište appears as being largely inhabited by an Orthodox Christian Albanian population. Due to Slavicisation, some families had a mixed Slav-Albanian anthroponomy - usually a Slavic first name and an Albanian last name or last names with Albanian patronyms and Slavic suffixes. 

The names are: Lazor, son of Arbanas; Gjon Arbanas; Dejan, his son; Gjergji Arbanas; Ivan, son of Dren; Dimitri, his son; Gjuri-ca Dralla; Lazor govedar (herder); Dobroslav, his brother; Mitran, his brother; Toni star (old man); Dejan, his son; Gjon the son-in-law of Radoslav; Kola, son of Zahari; Gjurgji, son of Zahari.

Demographics
As of the 2021 census, Gorno Palčište had 1,127 residents with the following ethnic composition:
Albanians 1,037
Persons for whom data are taken from administrative sources 90

According to the 2002 census, the village had a total of 1356 inhabitants. Ethnic groups in the village include:

Albanians 1339
Macedonians 1
Others 16

References

External links

Villages in Bogovinje Municipality
Albanian communities in North Macedonia